Argasi is a village and a community in the southern part of the island of Zakynthos. It is part of the municipal unit of Zakynthos (city). In 2011 its population was 639 for the village and 1,266 for the community, including the village Kalliteros. It is situated on the east coast of the island, at the northwestern foot of the hill Skopos. It is 3 km southeast of Zakynthos city and 3 km northeast of Kalamaki. Argasi is a popular beach resort. The beach is very small here and not recommended by locals for visiting.

Population

See also
List of settlements in Zakynthos

References

External links
Zante Argasi
Argasi at the GTP Travel Pages

Populated places in Zakynthos